Abarema piresii is a species of plant of the genus Abarema in the family Fabaceae. The species can be found in the state of Pará in northern Brazil.

Footnotes

References
  (1996): Silk Tree, Guanacaste, Monkey's Earring: A generic system for the synandrous Mimosaceae of the Americas. Part I. Abarema, Albizia, and Allies. Memoirs of the New York Botanical Garden 74(1): 1–292. 
  (2005): Genus Abarema. Version 10.01, November 2005. Retrieved 2009-12-19.

piresii